Alberto Jorge García Carpizo (born 26 September 1993) is a Mexican professional footballer who plays as a forward for Liga MX club Querétaro.

Club career

Early years
García was born in Guadalajara, where his father, Alberto "Guamerú" García, was playing at the time with C.D. Guadalajara. He is known as "Guamerucito" or "Guamerú Jr." in honor of his father. He started his career at the age of fifteen years in the fourth division team Santa Rosa F.C. and then moved to first division club Querétaro.

Querétaro
Under Argentine coach Ángel Comizzo, he then made his official Primera División debut at the age of eighteen on April 14, 2012, in a 2 to 2 draw away against San Luis, in which he also scored his first goal. Despite the successful start in Querétaro, he was only a used in the reserve squad most of the time.

Atlante
In the spring of 2013, García was loaned to Atlante F.C. for six months with an option for purchase. In the spring of the Clausura 2013 season the team reached the final of the cup - Copa MX. The club purchased him after his loan expired but at the end of the 2013/2014 season Atlante became relegated to the second division. Despite being relegated, he managed to have a good season. In one of Atlante's final matches of the first division, García scored a hat-trick.

Loan at Guadalajara
In June 2014, C.D. Guadalajara announced they had signed García on a one-year loan deal with an option of purchase. He was assigned the number 23 shirt, the same number his father wore during his time at the club.

Loan at América
In June 2015, Guadalajara rivals Club América shockingly announced they had signed García on a six-month loan deal with an option of purchase from Atlante after his loan expired with Guadalajara. An injury during pre-season led him to surgery, ruling him out of action for the rest of his loan.

Loan at U. de G.
In December 2015, Club Universidad de Guadalajara announced they had signed García on loan.

Personal life
Alberto's younger brother, Brian, is also a professional footballer who plays as a defender.

References

External links
https://web.archive.org/web/20150415173456/http://www.chivasdecorazon.com.mx/jugadores/43/alberto-jorge-garca-carpizo#.VSl82fnF9T0

1993 births
Living people
Footballers from Guadalajara, Jalisco
Association football forwards
Mexican footballers
Querétaro F.C. footballers
Atlante F.C. footballers
C.D. Guadalajara footballers
Club América footballers
Leones Negros UdeG footballers
Belén F.C. players
Tampico Madero F.C. footballers
Liga MX players
Mexican expatriate footballers
Expatriate footballers in Costa Rica
Mexican expatriate sportspeople in Costa Rica